The following highways are numbered 19A:

Canada
 British Columbia Highway 19A
 Prince Edward Island Route 19A

China
Taiwan Provincial Highway 19A

India
Karnataka State Highway 19A

United States
 Florida State Road A19A (former)
 County Road 19A (Lake County, Florida)
Maryland Route 19A
Maryland Route 19A (1951–1962) (former)
 County Road 19A (Washington County, Minnesota)
 Nebraska Spur 19A
 New York State Route 19A
 County Route 19A (Allegany County, New York)
 County Route 19A (Genesee County, New York)
 County Route 19A (Schoharie County, New York)
 County Route 19A (Suffolk County, New York)
 South Dakota Highway 19A